Umar Javed (born 10 November 1983) is a Pakistani former cricketer who played for Lahore cricket team. He played in 39 first-class and 19 List A matches between 2001 and 2009.

References

External links
 

1983 births
Living people
Pakistani cricketers
Lahore cricketers
Cricketers from Quetta